The Secret Agent is a 1996 British drama-thriller film written and directed by Christopher Hampton and starring Bob Hoskins and Patricia Arquette. It is adapted from Joseph Conrad's 1907 novel of the same name.

Cast
 Bob Hoskins as Verloc
 Patricia Arquette as Winnie
 Gérard Depardieu as Ossipon
 Christian Bale as Stevie
 Jim Broadbent as Chief Inspector Heat
 Eddie Izzard as Vladimir
 Ralph Nossek as Yundt 
 Elizabeth Spriggs as Winnie's mother
 Peter Vaughan as the Driver
 Julian Wadham as the Assistant Commissioner
 Robin Williams as the Professor (uncredited)

Reception
On Rotten Tomatoes the film has an approval rating of 50% based on reviews from 10 critics. On Metacritic, it also has a score of 41 out of 100, based on reviews from 17 critics, indicating "mixed or average reviews".

See also
 Sabotage (1936)
 The Secret Agent (1992, TV miniseries)
 The Secret Agent (2016, TV miniseries)

References

External links
 
 

1996 films
1996 drama films
1990s historical films
1990s thriller drama films
1990s English-language films
20th Century Fox films
British historical films
British spy films
Films about anarchism
Films about terrorism in Europe
Films based on British novels
Films based on works by Joseph Conrad
Films scored by Philip Glass
Films set in London
Films set in the 1890s
Fox Searchlight Pictures films
Remakes of British films
1990s British films